SugarBee (CN121) is an apple cultivar grown in the elevated orchards of Washington state. The variety was discovered by Chuck Nystrom in the early 1990s and developed in Minnesota, and is believed to be a cross-pollination between a Honeycrisp and another unknown variety. Today, SugarBee has worldwide propagation rights held by Regal Fruit International and is licensed to Gebbers Farms and the Chelan Fruit Cooperative in Washington to produce the variety in the United States.

References 

Apple cultivars
Apple production in Washington (state)